Banavasi is an ancient temple town located near Sirsi in Karnataka. Banavasi was the ancient capital of the Kannada empire Kadamba that ruled all of modern-day Karnataka state. They were the first native empire to bring Kannada and Karnataka to prominence.

History
Banavasi is one of the oldest town in the Karnataka state. It has grown up around the Madhukeshwara Temple built in the 5th century and dedicated to Shiva the supreme God in Shaivism, a major branch of Hinduism.

5th-century copper coin was discovered here with an inscription in the Kannada script, one of the oldest such coins ever discovered.

Adikavi Pampa, the first poet of Kannada, wrote his epics in Banavasi.
 
The town once was the capital of the Kadamba rulers, an ancient royal dynasty of Karnataka. They established themselves there in A.D. 345 and ruled South India for at least two centuries.

Banavasi contains some of the oldest architectural monuments in southern India.

Location
Banavasi lies in Malenadu region and is surrounded by forests and villages, with the Varada river flowing around it on three sides. Sirsi, is the nearest town about 23 km away. It is 400  km from Bengaluru. The nearest railway stations are 70  km away in Haveri and Talaguppa. The district Headquarters is Karwar.

Agriculture
The soil is fertile around Banavasi and paddy, wheat, sugarcane, arecanut, spices and pineapple are grown. Its specially known for pineapples, bananas and ginger. There are many pineapple farms on the edge of the village.

Attractions
The annual December cultural festival, Kadambothsava, is a huge gathering, organised by the state government, and featuring folk dancers, drama troupes, classical musicians, art exhibitions while drawing together performers, artists, and writers from throughout south India.

Banavasi has long been a cultural centre, especially the Yakshagana art form. Today local artisans craft and sell the classical folk art Yakshagana masks here.

Gallery

See also
 Banavasi.in (Official Website)
 Kadambas of Banavasi
 Banavasi Madhukeshwara Temple

References

External links

 Banavasi.in (Official Website)
 Ancient City of Banavasi
 5th century copper coin  discovered at Banavasi
 Bouncing off to Banavasi
 Coins of the Kadambas of Banavasi
 The Kadamba Kula: A History of Ancient and Mediaeval Karnataka
 A study of regional organization at Banavasi

Kadambas
Former capital cities in India
Tourist attractions in Uttara Kannada district